The 1970–71 season of the Moroccan Throne Cup is the 15th edition of the competition.

FAR de Rabat won the competition after beating Maghreb de Fès 8–7 on penalties after a 1–1 draw in the final, played at the Stade d'honneur in Casablanca. FAR de Rabat won the competition for the second time in their history.

Tournament

Last 16

Quarter-finals

Semi-finals

Final 

The final took place between the two winning semi-finalists, FAR de Rabat and Maghreb de Fès, on 5 September 1971 at the Stade d'honneur in Casablanca.

Notes and references 

1970
1970 in association football
1971 in association football
1970–71 in Moroccan football